Azziad Nasenya Wafula is a Kenyan actress, content creator, media host and social media personality. She is popularly known as Kenya's TikTok Queen. She has been active since 2019.

Early life
Born in Mumias, Azziad Nasenya grew up in Kakamega and Nairobi. Azziad studied at Central Primary School, Mumias, Cathsam School, Nairobi and eventually completed her primary education at Lugulu Girls Boarding Primary School. She thereafter went to St. Cecilia Misikhu Girls' High School, Misikhu and completed her secondary education in 2017. Azziad started acting and dancing in school skits in Class 2 (at the age of 7) and continued doing so while in high school.

Career

Theatre
Azziad performed solo verses while in high school, competing to the National Level of The Kenya Schools and Colleges Drama Festival. In December 2017, having completed her secondary education, Azziad joined the Hearts of Art Theatre Group in Nairobi, Kenya. Her first role in the Group was as a supporting cast in the play Repair my Heart in March 2018. Between 2018 and 2019, Azziad was cast in 7 stage plays by Hearts of Art. While performing for the group, Azziad met her current manager, Peter Kawa, who is an actor, director, producer and filmmaker.

TikTok 
Azziad joined TikTok in August 2019 where she showcased her dancing, lipsync and acting skills. Her TikTok account topped some of the TikTok challenges and was verified in February 2020, earning her the Title East Africa TikTok Queen. In April 2020, a video of Azziad dancing to Femi One and Mejja's Utawezana song went viral.

Television
In early 2020, Azziad was cast as a lead female role in a TV series. Due to the coronavirus pandemic, production was postponed.

In June 2020, Azziad debuted as Chichi in Selina Telenovela on Maisha Magic East by M-Net and MultiChoice. She also played Bianca and Fatuma in the series.

In July 2020, Azziad and Mwaniki Mageria co-hosted Concert Nyumbani, a TV show celebrating COVID-19 heroes.

Filmography

Additional information
Azziad hosts The Shoe Game with Azziad on her YouTube channel, where she explores the stories behind her guests' shoes.

In September 2020, Azziad was appointed as an Official Global Ambassador for the Save Our Future campaign.

Awards 
In 2021 Azziad was nominated for an international E! People's Choice Awards, in the African social star category.

References

External links
 

Living people
Kenyan film actresses
2000 births
People from Nairobi
21st-century Kenyan actresses